The Opéra national du Rhin is an opera company which performs in Alsace, eastern France. It includes the Opéras in Strasbourg, in Mulhouse, where the Ballet de l'Opéra national du Rhin, also known as the Ballet Du Rhin, is based, and in Colmar, with its Opéra Studio, a training centre for young singers. Thee organisation has held the status of "national opera" since 1997.

The Orchestre philharmonique de Strasbourg and the Orchestre symphonique de Mulhouse are the usual orchestras of this institution.

History
The first opera house opened in Strasbourg in 1701 in a converted granary. After a fire and temporary locations, a new Théâtre municipal opened in the Place Broglie in 1821. This building was virtually gutted during the German bombardment of 1870, but it was rebuilt in identical style, re-opening in 1873.

During the German era up to 1919, several eminent conductors held posts at the Strasbourg opera: Hans Pfitzner (1910–19), Wilhelm Furtwängler (1910–11), Otto Klemperer (1914–17) and George Szell (1917–1919). From 1919-38 Paul Bastide was musical director; he returned after the Second World War with notable stagings of Béatrice et Bénédict (first French staging), and Martine by Rabaud (premiere).

From 1948-53, under Roger Lalande, the theatre saw the first French productions of Peter Grimes (1949), Mathis der Maler (1951), and The Rake's Progress (1952). The spirit of innovation continued under Frédéric Adam, director from 1955-72 - a Ring with Birgit Nilsson and French premieres of Il prigioniero, Oedipus rex, Jenůfa, Die Frau ohne Schatten and Dalibor; there was also a production of Les Troyens.

The merger to form the Opéra du Rhin took place in 1972 under the conductor Alain Lombard, with the Orchestre philharmonique de Strasbourg and the Orchestre symphonique de Mulhouse being the performance orchestras in those locations. In the early years, Lombard attempted to revive the repertoire, as well as attract big names such as Birgit Nilsson, Montserrat Caballé, José Carreras, Régine Crespin, and Mirella Freni.

Since 1985 the Ballet de l'Opéra national du Rhin, or Ballet Du Rhin for short, a national centre for choreography has been based at the Mulhouse Opera.

It has held the status of "national opera" since 1997.

The Opéra Studio, a training centre for young singers, is based at Colmar.

Management
At the end of the 1970s Lombard was succeeded by René Terrasson, a former singer and architect, who also produced some works himself. Since that time, directors have included Laurent Spielmann (1991–1997), Rudolf Berger (1997–2003), and Nicholas Snowman (2003–2009). Since 2020, the director has been Alain Perroux, taking over from the suddenly deceased Eva Kleinitz.
 1972–1974: Pierre Barrat
 1974–1980: Alain Lombard
 1980–1991: René Terrasson
 1991–1997: Laurent Spielmann
 1997–2003: Rudolf Berger
 2003–2009: Nicholas Snowman
 2009–2017: Marc Clémeur
 2017–2019: Eva Kleinitz
 2020– : Alain Perroux

See also
List of opera houses

References

External links

 Official website

French opera companies
Culture in Strasbourg
Mulhouse
Tourist attractions in Strasbourg
Monuments historiques of Strasbourg
Organizations based in Grand Est